Cerezo Fung a Wing (born 24 September 1983 in Paramaribo, Suriname) is a Dutch football defender who last played for Dutch Eerste Klasse outfit Ajax Zaterdag.

His ancestors came from China and moved to Suriname. "Fung A Wing" is his ancestor's full name and in fact, in accordance with the habits of the Chinese people, his real last name is Fung(馮).

Club career
He made his professional league debut for Volendam in a 5–1 victory over Helmond Sport on 19 October 2001. He played for Volendam for four seasons, making a total of 83 league appearances. Fung a Wing then joined RKC Waalwijk initially on loan in 2005. He made the move permanent in the summer of 2005 and remained with the club until signing for De Graafschap in 2007. He was contracted with De Graafschap until 2010 and joined IJsselmeervogels thereafter.

Honours
De Graafschap
 Eerste Divisie: 2009–10

References

1983 births
Living people
Sportspeople from Paramaribo
Dutch footballers
Surinamese people of Chinese descent
Hakka sportspeople
Surinamese emigrants to the Netherlands
Dutch people of Chinese descent
Sportspeople of Chinese descent
FC Volendam players
RKC Waalwijk players
De Graafschap players
Eredivisie players
Eerste Divisie players
AFC Ajax (amateurs) players
Association football wing halves